Karl Elof Lindström (17 December 1897 – 29 November 1988) was a Swedish athlete who competed in the 1920 Summer Olympics. He was born and died in Eksjö and was the younger brother of Gunnar Lindström. In 1920 he finished 13th in the javelin throw event.

References

External links
 profile

1897 births
1988 deaths
Swedish male javelin throwers
Olympic athletes of Sweden
Athletes (track and field) at the 1920 Summer Olympics